Awat County is a county in Aksu Prefecture, Xinjiang Uyghur Autonomous Region, China. Awat County is located on the southern foot of the Tian Shan mountain range and on the northern edge of the Taklamakan Desert.

History
In 1930, Awat County was established.

On January 23, 2013,  of territory was transferred from Awat County to Aral city.

In a 2018 report from Radio Free Asia, Awat County was said to have three re-education camps. An RFA listener provided a copy of a "confidentiality agreement" requiring re-education camp detainees to not discuss the workings of the camps and said local residents were instructed to tell members of re-education camp inspection teams visiting No. 2 Re-education Camp, which had transferred thousands detainees and removed barbed wire from the perimeter  of the camp walls, that there was only one camp in the county.

During the COVID-19 pandemic in mainland China, on February 23, 2020, 114 Uyghur workers from Awat County (Awati) were sent to Jiujiang, Jiangxi to resume work.

Administrative divisions
Awat County is made up of five towns, three townships and one other area:

Towns ( / ):
Awat Town (Awati;  / ), Besheriq (Baishi'airike;  / , formerly ), Ghoruchol (Wuluquele;  / , formerly ), Tamtoghraq (Tamutuogelake;  / , formerly  / ), Yengierik (Ying'airike, Yengieriq;  / , formerly  / )

Townships ( / ):
Aybagh Township (Ayibage;  / ), Dolan Township (Duolang;  / ), Baytoghraq Township (Bagetuolake;  / )

Other areas:
 Aksu Prison

Demographics 

As of 2015, 217,722 of the 262,842 residents of the county were Uyghur, 42,960 were Han Chinese, 2,160 were from other ethnic groups.

As of 1999, 81.59% of the population of Awat (Awati) County was Uyghur and 17.74% of the population was Han Chinese.

Climate

Economy
A developed irrigation system is in place and agricultural products include wheat, rice, corn and cotton. Sheep are the primary livestock in the county. Industries include coal, construction, food processing, leathermaking and carpetmaking.

One quarter of the cotton production in Aksu prefecture comes from the county.

Historical maps
Historical English-language maps including Awat:

Notes

References

County-level divisions of Xinjiang
Aksu Prefecture